Júnior Toretta Ernandes, known as Júnior (born May 7, 1988) is a Brazilian footballer who last played for SC Telstar.

Club career
Junior joined Paykan in 2010 after spending the previous season at Gol Gohar in the Azadegan League.

 Assist Goals

References

1988 births
Living people
Brazilian footballers
Association football midfielders
Estrela do Norte Futebol Clube players
Esporte Clube Bahia players
Paykan F.C. players
Gol Gohar players
Saipa F.C. players
Sport Club Internacional players
Vitória F.C. players
SC Telstar players
Eerste Divisie players
Persian Gulf Pro League players
Azadegan League players
Brazilian expatriate footballers
Expatriate footballers in Iran
Brazilian expatriate sportspeople in Iran
Expatriate footballers in the Netherlands
Brazilian expatriate sportspeople in the Netherlands